This article is about climate engineering geoengineering topics, related to greenhouse gas remediation

Solar radiation management
Solar radiation management
Stratospheric sulfur aerosols (climate engineering)
Marine cloud brightening
Cool roof
Space sunshade
 Stratospheric Particle Injection for Climate Engineering

Carbon dioxide removal
Carbon dioxide removal
Greenhouse gas removal
Biochar
Bio-energy with carbon capture and storage
Carbon sequestration
Direct air capture
Ocean fertilization
Enhanced weathering
 Carbon air capture

Other greenhouse gas remediation 
 Greenhouse gas removal
 CFC laser photochemistry

Other projects
Arctic geoengineering
Cirrus Cloud Thinning

References

 
Climate change-related lists
Outlines of sciences
Wikipedia outlines

External links
 An interactive Geoengineering Map prepared by ETC Group and the Heinrich Boell Foundation